opened in , Yokosuka, Kanagawa Prefecture, Japan, in 2007. The collection, numbering some 5,000 pieces, includes works by Fujishima Takeji and Nakamura Tsune.

See also
 Kannonzaki Lighthouse
 List of Cultural Properties of Japan - paintings (Kanagawa)

References

External links
  Yokosuka Museum of Art
  Collection Database

Museums in Kanagawa Prefecture
Buildings and structures in Yokosuka, Kanagawa
Art museums and galleries in Japan
Museums established in 2007
2007 establishments in Japan